Auto Parts Warehouse (APW) is an American online retailer of automotive parts and accessories for cars, vans, trucks, and sport utility vehicles. Along with CarParts.com and JC Whitney, it was one of the flagship websites of CarParts.com, an American online provider of aftermarket auto parts, including collision parts, engine parts, and performance parts and accessories.

History 
Founded in 1995, Auto Parts Warehouse operated as a small-scale auto parts distributor in California until it was established as large scale e-commerce site for the automotive aftermarket.

In April 2020, Auto Parts Warehouse was merged into CarParts.com.

Products and Services
The online retailing site offers numerous automotive-related products through its online sales channels and direct partnerships with suppliers and manufacturers. By eliminating intermediaries common in most supply chains, Auto Parts Warehouse is able to provide a broad selection of automotive parts and accessories and has structured a discount pricing scheme for individual consumers, advocating the DIY (do it yourself) and DIFM (do it for me) market. Its product lineup includes automotive parts and accessories for more than 50 vehicle brands, including domestic and imported makes and models. It sells automotive merchandise from nearly 700 labels, including:

Global aftermarket suppliers
 A1 Cardone
 ACDelco
 Bosch
 Denso
 Dorman

Performance parts manufacturers
 Eibach
 Edelbrock
 K&N
 Magnaflow

Specialty brands
 Anzo (vehicle accessories) 
 Coverking (vehicle accessories) 
 Husky Liners (vehicle accessories)
 Behr (automotive cooling systems) 
 Centric (brakes)
 EBC (brakes)
 Powerstop (brakes)
 KYB (shocks and struts)
 Timken (seals and bearings)
 American Racing (wheels) 
 Enkei (wheels) 
 OZ (wheels) 
 BFGoodrich (tires) 
 Goodyear (tires) 
 Firestone (tires)

The e-commerce site uses a proprietary product database for tracking SKUs for wide-range product applications based on vehicle make, model, year, and other specifications.

Community
In April 2014, the company introduced the Heroes Automobile Gallery, where active service members and veterans can post pictures of their vehicle and share their own stories. The program also offered 20% military discount on automotive parts. The company also restored several vehicles of service members as a promotion.

External links
Official Site

References

Automotive part retailers of the United States
Online automotive companies of the United States
American companies established in 1995
Retail companies established in 1995
Internet properties established in 1995
Retail companies based in California
Companies based in Los Angeles County, California
Carson, California